AFC Wimbledon is an English professional football club, based in Merton, London, that plays in the EFL League Two, after being relegated from the EFL League One following the 2021–22 season. The club's home stadium is Plough Lane.

Most of the Wimbledon F.C. supporters were very strongly opposed to moving the club so far away from Wimbledon, feeling that a club transplanted to a distant location would no longer represent Wimbledon or the club's historic legacy and tradition. Wimbledon F.C. moved in 2003 and formally changed the name of the club to Milton Keynes Dons in 2004.

When AFC Wimbledon was formed, it affiliated to both the London and Surrey Football Associations, and entered the Premier Division of the Combined Counties League, the ninth tier of English football. The club has since been promoted six times in 13 seasons, going from the ninth tier (Combined Counties Premier) to the third (League One).

AFC Wimbledon currently hold the record for the longest unbeaten run of league matches in English senior football, having played 78 consecutive league games without a defeat between February 2003 and December 2004. They are the first club formed in the 21st century to make it into the Football League.

The club was initially based at Kingsmeadow, a ground bought from and then shared with Isthmian League club Kingstonian F.C. until 2017, and with Chelsea F.C. Women from 2017. In November 2020, the club moved to Plough Lane, a new stadium on the site of the defunct Wimbledon Greyhound Stadium, only 250 yards away from the original Plough Lane, Wimbledon F.C.'s home until 1991. The new stadium has an initial capacity of 9,215, with the option of expansion to a maximum 20,000 at a later date.

History

Foundation

On 28 May 2002, the Football Association approved a decision by a three-person arbitration commission they had appointed to allow Wimbledon F.C. to relocate north to the new town of Milton Keynes in Buckinghamshire; a decision influenced, among other factors, by claims from Wimbledon chairman Charles Koppel that such a move was necessary in order to prevent the club from going bankrupt.

Although the absence of a ground in Milton Keynes meeting Football League criteria meant that the club were unable to physically move for over a year, major organised protests at the decision continued to be held by Wimbledon's traditional local support and a boycott of the club's home matches at Selhurst Park meant attendances dwindled immediately.

Following the F.A.'s announcement of their decision, a group of Wimbledon supporters led by Kris Stewart and fellow founding members Marc Jones and Trevor Williams met in The Fox and Grapes pub on Wimbledon Common to plan what was to be done next as part of the protest. It was agreed that as there was no right of appeal, the only option was to start the club again from scratch. On 30 May 2002 the idea was put forward in a Wimbledon Independent Supporters' Association meeting to create a new community-based club named AFC Wimbledon and an appeal for funds was launched.

On 13 June 2002, a new manager, a playing strip and badge based on that of the original Wimbledon FC, and a stadium were unveiled to fans and the media at the packed-out Wimbledon Community Centre. In order to assemble a competitive team at very short notice, AFC Wimbledon held player trials on 29 June 2002 on Wimbledon Common, open to any unattached player who felt he was good enough to try out for the team. The event attracted 230 hopeful players, from whom the club's squad for their inaugural season was eventually chosen.

Non-League football (2002–2011)

Combined Counties League (2002–2004)
In the 2002–03 season, AFC Wimbledon competed in the Combined Counties League Premier Division under the management of former Wimbledon F.C. player Terry Eames, who was appointed on 13 June 2002. Their first ever game, a pre-season friendly against Sutton United on 10 July 2002, resulted in a 4–0 loss in front of a crowd of 4,657. At the end of their debut season, AFC Wimbledon finished third in the league and narrowly failed to win promotion to the Isthmian League First Division, despite a strong end to the season that involved winning their final 11 league fixtures.

In 2003–04, AFC Wimbledon won their first 21 league games before a 2–2 draw against Sandhurst Town on 10 January 2004, giving them 32 consecutive wins in league games over two seasons. Manager Terry Eames was suspended on 13 February 2004 and sacked five days later on the grounds of gross misconduct, after evidence was produced which showed him to have firstly made unauthorised and untrue representations to a number of the coaching staff, secondly, that he had falsely informed members of the coaching staff that the club had decided not to support his plans for youth football and required him to make immediate budgetary cut-backs and thirdly that he dispensed with the services of members of the coaching staff citing untrue reasons. Assistant manager Nick English took charge with immediate effect. The team went on to finish as champions of the Combined Counties League with an unbeaten record for the season of 42 wins and four draws. AFC Wimbledon also won the league's Premier Challenge Cup after beating North Greenford United 4–1 in the Final on 30 April 2004, completing a double for the season.

Isthmian League (2004–2008)
Dave Anderson was appointed as new manager on 11 May 2004. Under his leadership AFC Wimbledon took their good form into the 2004–05 season during which they competed in the Isthmian League First Division — they remained top of the division for the duration of the season, and were convincing title-winners, sealing promotion to the League's Premier Division. The Dons secured another double by defeating Walton & Hersham 2–1 in the Final of the Surrey Senior Cup on 3 May 2005. Over the course of the season, AFC Wimbledon set a new record for the longest run of unbeaten league games at any level of senior football in the United Kingdom. The team remained unbeaten for 78 league matches between 22 February 2003 (a 2–0 defeat at home to Withdean 2000) and 4 December 2004 (a 2–0 defeat at Cray Wanderers). 

The 2005–06 season proved far more competitive than previous seasons – as after winning their first few games, AFC Wimbledon found themselves struggling to remain in the play-off places. After fluctuating form they eventually reached the play-offs after a 1–0 win against Anderson's former club, Hendon, on 22 April 2006. However, a 2–1 defeat at Fisher Athletic on 2 May 2006 prevented the club from achieving three back-to-back promotions. The Dons once again reached the final of the Surrey Senior Cup, however, this time they were narrowly defeated 1–0 by Kingstonian in a fiercely contested derby.

Much of the 2006–07 season was overshadowed by the threat of a proposed 18-point deduction by the FA for the club's fielding of Jermaine Darlington who, it transpired, had not been registered correctly by the club and had therefore played in three games whilst still officially ineligible. However, this punishment was eventually reduced to a three-point deduction and a £400 fine on appeal, after the FA finally acknowledged that the club had made a simple administrative error. The 'Darlington affair' also resulted in expulsion from the Surrey Senior Cup and the FA Trophy that year. Although AFC Wimbledon did enough to qualify for the play-offs, they once again missed out on promotion, this time as a result of losing 1–0 to Bromley in the play-off semi-final on 1 May 2007. Manager Dave Anderson subsequently left the club by mutual consent on 2 May 2007.

Terry Brown was appointed as the new AFC Wimbledon manager on 15 May 2007. During 2007–08, he led the club to promotion to the Conference South in his first season in charge, a feat which predecessor Dave Anderson had proved unable to achieve, having lost two consecutive play-off final opportunities in the previous two seasons. The Dons made steady progress throughout the season, qualifying for the play-offs after finishing third in the League. AFC Wimbledon beat AFC Hornchurch 3–1 in the play-off semi-final on 29 April 2008 and went on to triumph 2–1 over Staines Town in the play-off final on 3 May 2008.

The Conference (2008–2011)

AFC Wimbledon spent most of the 2008–09 season near the top of the league table, eventually finishing as champions and earning promotion to the Conference Premier after defeating St Albans City 3–0 on 25 April 2009. The match set an attendance record of 4,722 for Kingsmeadow stadium, which at that time was full capacity.

The 2009–10 season was the club's first in the Conference Premier. Overall the Dons finished eighth, 14 points short of the play-off zone. This was the first season in which the club had failed to make the top five in the league table.

In 2010–11 AFC Wimbledon finished as runners-up of the Conference Premier, qualifying for the play-offs. The Dons faced fifth placed Fleetwood Town in the play-off semi-finals, whom they went on to thrash 8–1 on aggregate. This aggregate scoreline set a record as the largest winning margin recorded since the Conference Premier first introduced the play-off system at the beginning of the 2002–03 season. In the play-off final at the City of Manchester Stadium on 21 May 2011, in front of a crowd of 18,195, AFC Wimbledon beat Luton Town 4–3 in a penalty shoot-out, after the match had ended 0–0 in extra time. The victory resulted in promotion to the Football League and represented the club's fifth promotion in nine years. The club's achievement of attaining League status after just nine seasons of existence is considered to be one of the fastest ascents for a new club since automatic promotion to the Football League first commenced in the 1980s. AFC Wimbledon also hold the record of being the first club to be formed in the 21st century to make it into the Football League, making them the youngest club in the Football League by some distance.

Football League (2011–present)

League Two (2011–2016)

The 2011–12 season saw AFC Wimbledon's promotion to League Two. The team started the season well, winning seven out of their first 12 matches, but failed to keep the momentum going and had a poor run, eventually finishing the season ranked 16th, 10 points clear of the relegation zone.

The 2012–13 campaign marked the 10th anniversary of AFC Wimbledon's inaugural season. After an abysmal start to the season, manager Terry Brown was sacked on 19 September 2012 along with assistant manager Stuart Cash, with AFC Wimbledon sitting just above the relegation zone. First team coach Simon Bassey took over as caretaker manager with immediate effect. Bassey was in charge just four matches, however, before former Wimbledon player Neal Ardley was appointed as Terry Brown's permanent replacement on 10 October 2012, naming former Watford and Cardiff City teammate Neil Cox as his assistant manager. On 2 December 2012, AFC Wimbledon faced Milton Keynes Dons in the second round of the FA Cup, in the first ever meeting between the two sides following the relocation of Wimbledon F.C. to Milton Keynes, with the match ending as a 2–1 defeat for AFC Wimbledon. The Dons secured their Football League status on the final day of the 2012–13 season, despite having started the day in the relegation zone, by beating Fleetwood Town 2–1 at Kingsmeadow on 27 April 2013.

In the 2013–14 season, a match involving AFC Wimbledon was at the centre of a failed match-fixing plot. Shortly after the club's 1–0 loss against Dagenham & Redbridge on 26 November 2013, businessmen Krishna Ganeshan and Chann Sankaran and three Whitehawk players—Michael Boateng, Moses Swaibu and Hakeem Adelakun—were charged with conspiracy to commit bribery over a failed plot to fix the game. Ganeshan, Sankaran and Boateng were convicted. The club had a disappointing season overall, only managing to replicate the 20th placed league finish of the season before after the club were docked three points for the ineligible fielding of Jake Nicholson after failing to obtain international clearance for him after he joined from Scottish Championship side Greenock Morton on 19 February 2014.

The 2014–15 season saw AFC Wimbledon face Milton Keynes Dons once again in a competitive fixture on 12 August 2014 in the first round of the Football League Cup, with MK Dons eventually winning the match 3–1. The two sides met once again on 7 October 2014, with AFC Wimbledon achieving a first 3–2 win over their rivals in the second round of the Football League Trophy following a late goal from Adebayo Akinfenwa. The Dons also reached the FA Cup third round for the first time in their history on 5 January 2015, eventually succumbing 2–1 to Liverpool with Steven Gerrard scoring both goals. AFC Wimbledon finished the season in a mediocre 15th place after a disappointing run of form saw them finish the season without a win in their last eight league fixtures. 

The 2015–16 season was AFC Wimbledon's fifth consecutive season in League Two. Despite getting the season off to a mediocre start, the Dons finished the season strongly, winning seven out of their last 10 league matches to ensure that the club would confirm their highest ever League Two finish of seventh place and qualification to the 2016 Football League play-offs. A record home attendance of 4,870 turned out to see AFC Wimbledon beat Accrington Stanley 1–0 in the first leg of the play-off semi-final on 14 May 2016 (exactly 28 years to the day since the original Wimbledon won the 1988 FA Cup Final against Liverpool) following a dramatic extra time winner from academy product Tom Beere. This goal ultimately proved to be the difference between the two sides as AFC Wimbledon went on to win 3–2 on aggregate after a 2–2 draw in the reverse fixture. This win earned them a place in the play-off final at Wembley Stadium against Plymouth Argyle. The fixture was scheduled for 30 May 2016, exactly 14 years to the day since the club's foundation. AFC Wimbledon ultimately triumphed 2–0 on the day in front of a crowd of 57,956.

League One (2016–2022)

The 2016–17 season saw AFC Wimbledon compete in League One for the first time in their history. They remained unbeaten in the South London derby fixtures, recording two draws against Millwall, a home draw against Charlton Athletic, and a 2–1 away win at The Valley on 17 September 2016. Promotion also placed AFC Wimbledon in the same division as Milton Keynes Dons, who had simultaneously been relegated from the Championship. This ensured the club would face Milton Keynes Dons for the first time at Kingsmeadow which they did on 14 March 2017, going on to triumph 2–0. The club ultimately finished 15th in the league, after a disappointing slump saw them win just five out of their last 22 league matches between January and April.

AFC Wimbledon made an equally slow start to the 2017–18 campaign, managing just five wins in their first 20 league matches between August and December. On 3 December 2017, the club recorded a 3–1 win over South London derby rivals Charlton Athletic in the second round of the FA Cup. The club were subsequently rewarded by being drawn away against Tottenham Hotspur in the third round with the match being played at Wembley Stadium on 7 January 2018. On 13 December 2017, the club received a further boost after being granted permission to begin work on constructing a new 9,300-seater stadium (which could be expanded to hold up to 20,000 in the future) on the site of Wimbledon Greyhound Stadium. The club was eventually able to secure another season in League One with a draw in their penultimate game, meaning that for the first time, AFC Wimbledon would be playing in a higher division than the Milton Keynes Dons, who were relegated that season.

AFC Wimbledon saw a disastrous start to the 2018–19 season, losing twelve of their first seventeen league games. Manager Neal Ardley departed the club by mutual agreement on 12 November 2018 after a tenure of 6 years, 1 month, 2 days, making him the longest serving manager to date. One bright spot in their season was the club's first ever appearance in the FA Cup 5th Round after beating West Ham United 4–2 in the 2018–19 FA Cup. On 4 December 2018, Glyn Hodges joined Wally Downes as AFC Wimbledon's assistant manager. After being rooted to the bottom of the table for most of 2019, they lost only 1 of their last 12 league games to lift them out of the relegation zone, ultimately staying up on goal difference on the last day of the season after a 0–0 draw with already relegated Bradford City. On 25 September 2019, Glyn Hodges took over the management of the first team on a temporary basis following the suspension of Wally Downes after being charged by the FA for betting misconduct. The club's youth coach, Mark Robinson, replaced Hodges on 30 January 2021, after a run of poor results; Robinson turned the season around and the club avoided relegation on the second-last matchday.

Season-by-season record

Crest and colours
The club crest, which is based on the coat of arms of the Municipal Borough of Wimbledon, features a black double headed eagle in reference to a local legend that Julius Caesar once made camp on Wimbledon Common, this symbol being his own attributed coat of arms.

The colours that were chosen for the AFC Wimbledon kit were the royal blue and yellow traditionally associated with the rise of the original Wimbledon F.C. to the top of the Football League (rather than the darker navy blue and yellow that Wimbledon F.C. were wearing at the time, which had been a recent adaptation in 1993). The first ever kit, which was used only during the pre-season friendlies of 2002, consisted of a royal blue shirt, white shorts and white socks. Since then, the home kit has always been predominantly all royal blue with yellow detailing. The away kit used between 2002 and 2004 was white, however since then it has usually been predominantly yellow with blue detailing.

To mark their first game in the Football League on 6 August 2011 against Bristol Rovers, the team wore a white and blue commemorative kit which was based on that worn by the original Wimbledon F.C. during 1977–78 in order to remember their own first season as a member of the Football League in the old Fourth Division (now League Two). To prevent copyright infringement, a single blue stripe replaced the three trade mark stripes of the Adidas original and the shirts were emblazoned with a modified crest for the occasion.

On 14 May 2020 the club released a new, slightly modified, official club crest to mark 32 years since Wimbledon's 1988 FA Cup victory, as well as the forthcoming opening of the new stadium at Plough Lane.

Sponsorship and kit manufacturer

AFC Wimbledon's shirts have been sponsored by computer games developers Sports Interactive since the club's inception in 2002. The kit used by the club is currently manufactured by Puma. Previous manufacturers have been Umbro (2002), Tempest Sports (2002–14), and Admiral Sportswear (2014–17). Other club sponsors are Reston Waste, Cherry Red Records, and author and YouTuber John Green.

In April 2022, the club announced that it would be switching its kit manufacturer for start of the 2022–23 season to Hummel, a nostalgic link up with the kit manufacturer of the former Wimbledon F.C. in 1988–89  & 1989–99 seasons.

Mascot

In 2006, AFC Wimbledon introduced a new mascot to represent the club, a Womble known as "Haydon" after Haydons Road, the nearest railway station to both Wimbledon F.C.'s original home ground, Plough Lane (1912–98), and the current Plough Lane.

Rivalries

Milton Keynes Dons

The most obvious of AFC Wimbledon's rivals are Milton Keynes Dons, the club which resulted from the relocation of Wimbledon F.C. to Milton Keynes in 2003. However there is some debate amongst AFC Wimbledon supporters as to whether this should be considered a rivalry. Since some supporters do not recognise the legitimacy of the club, it is argued they cannot be considered rivals. The two sides have met four times in cup competitions, all games at Milton Keynes, of which AFC Wimbledon have won one and one game went to penalties. Owing to MK Dons' relegation from the Championship in the 2015–16 season, alongside AFC Wimbledon's promotion from League Two, AFC Wimbledon and Milton Keynes Dons competed in the same league division for the first time in the 2016–17 season. Both clubs won one and lost one in that season's league matches. In the 9 league matches played between the clubs, Wimbledon won 1, drew 3, and lost 5.

Crawley Town
One of AFC Wimbledon's main rivals have been Crawley Town. This is purely due to their frequently fractious meetings at a non-league level since 2009. The two sides did not play each other between 2012 and 2015 due to Crawley's promotion to League One. However Crawley's relegation during the 2014–15 Football League One season meant the two sides played each other on 15 August 2015 which the Dons won 2–1 after going a goal down.

Since Wimbledon's 2016 promotion into League One, they have met just once competitively in the 2nd round of the 2020/2021 Emirates FA Cup with Crawley Town winning 2–1.

Sutton United
AFC Wimbledon had never shared a league with Sutton United before 2022, but due to the geographical proximity the two clubs share a friendly rivalry. Sutton were the first team to play the reformed Dons on 10 July 2002, defeating them 4–0 at Gander Green Lane. Before they met in the FA Cup in 2017, the most recent competitive match between the two sides was in the 2013 Surrey Senior Cup semi-final at Gander Green Lane on 11 April 2013, a game which Sutton won 5–2. The clubs played each other in the third round of the FA Cup on 7 January 2017, which resulted in a 0–0 draw. The replay took place at Kingsmeadow on 17 January 2017, with Sutton winning 3–1. The two clubs will both be in League Two for the 2022–23 season.

Stadium

Plough Lane

Since its inception in 2002, AFC Wimbledon had stated that one of its primary aims was to play in Merton, with a new stadium close to what it regards as its "spiritual home" of the original Plough Lane, where the original Wimbledon F.C. had played for over 80 years. This aim formed the basis of a project to create a new purpose-built stadium on the site of the Wimbledon Greyhound Stadium, located on Plough Lane approximately 250 yards from where the old football stadium had stood.

Plans to develop the greyhound stadium site as either a multi-purpose stadium or as a football stadium were publicised frequently by the club and the media prior to 2013. In 2013 AFC Wimbledon announced that discussions were underway with Merton Council over a joint bid for the greyhound stadium and surrounding land, in cooperation with developer Galliard Homes, to build a new football stadium, 600 residential units and a wide range of shops and community facilities.

The plans for the football stadium were approved unanimously by Merton Council on 10 December 2015. Clearance of the site in preparation for the new football stadium and housing was begun on 16 March 2018. The stadium's opening was initially planned for summer 2019, however, delays caused the approximate completion date to be moved to 25 October 2020. The land's freehold was transferred to an AFC Wimbledon subsidiary on 24 December 2018, among other transactions that also formally transferred ownership of Kingsmeadow to Chelsea.

Wimbledon played the first four home matches of the 2020–21 season at Loftus Road whilst Plough Lane was being completed. The club played its first match at Plough Lane on the evening of 3 November 2020 with a 2–2 draw against Doncaster Rovers.

Loftus Road

AFC Wimbledon started the 2020–21 season at Loftus Road after agreeing a temporary groundshare agreement with Queens Park Rangers, while construction of Plough Lane was completed. They played four league games at the ground, plus two cup ties, before departing at the end of October 2020.  Due to the coronavirus restrictions in place at that time, all of the club's  games at Loftus Road were played behind closed doors.

Kingsmeadow

The club played at the 4,850 capacity Kingsmeadow in Kingston upon Thames until May 2020. Until 2017, AFC Wimbledon groundshared with Kingstonian with the Dons being the landlords and Kingstonian the tenants since the summer of 2003; before then the roles were reversed. In November 2015 AFC Wimbledon supporters voted to approve the selling of Kingsmeadow to Chelsea F.C. to help fund a planned new ground in Merton, On 13 December 2017, the contract was signed for the new stadium to be built, with Kingstonian leaving the ground in 2017 as a result.

Ground purchase and debt
Upon their foundation in 2002, AFC Wimbledon entered into a ground–sharing arrangement with Kingstonian to play home fixtures at Kingsmeadow in the neighbouring borough of Kingston upon Thames.

After Kingstonian entered administration to avoid bankruptcy and lost the Kingsmeadow lease in October 2001. It was assigned in April 2002 by the administrators to a property developer, Rajesh Khosla, who was also by then owner of the club.

After an SGM, it was felt by the AFC Wimbledon board of directors that securing ownership of Kingsmeadow would safeguard the ground for the future of both clubs. In March 2003 the Dons Trust members voted to purchase part of the lease for Kingsmeadow and in June 2003 the contract for buying the lease to the stadium was agreed with Rajesh Khosla; £3 million needed to be raised.

AFC Wimbledon were already sub-tenants at Kingsmeadow, before raising £2.4 million to buy the lease from Khosla in June 2003, with a view to making Kingsmeadow their home. Kingstonian secured a 25-year sub-tenancy agreement with AFC Wimbledon, with customary break clauses. The clubs operated a ground-sharing arrangement, with Kingstonian receiving preferentially cheap rental terms.

Expansion
At the end of the 2011–12 season, AFC Wimbledon commenced work on building a new 1,000 capacity all-seater stand to replace the existing Kingston Road End. This was completed by 13 October 2012 game against Cheltenham Town which saw an attendance of 4,409. The new stand was named the North Stand before being renamed The Nongshim Stand and in July 2015 the John Green Stand following sponsorship deals. The work increased the stadium capacity to approximately 4,850 with 2,265 seats.

Sale
In 2015, AFC Wimbledon agreed plans to sell Kingsmeadow to Chelsea in order to help finance their plans to move to a new stadium in Merton. Chelsea's intention was to use the ground for their own youth and women's teams and were not willing to accommodate Kingstonian. This was met with protests from Kingstonian fans, as the club would be left without a home ground of their own. Since the sale, Kingstonian have had to groundshare with Leatherhead and then Corinthian-Casuals. AFC Wimbledon departed Kingsmeadow in May 2020.

Ownership and legal status
AFCW plc was placed under the ownership of The Dons Trust, a supporters' group which is pledged to retain at least 75% control of that ownership. In 2003 a minority interest was sold in a share issue in order to finance the purchase of Kingsmeadow; given the circumstances of the club's formation, this decision raised concerns among some members but was quickly accepted.

The Dons Trust is an industrial and provident society registered with the Financial Services Authority as "Wimbledon Football Club Supporters' Society Limited". This is not to be confused with Wimbledon Independent Supporters Association (WISA) although WISA has as one of its stated constitutional aims "to purchase shares in AFC Wimbledon's holding company".

The original chief executive was Erik Samuelson, a retired accountant, who carried out his full-time duties in return for the nominal sum of one guinea a year, because "it sounded posher than a pound". Samuelson retired in 2019; he was replaced by the club's former COO, Joe Palmer.

Community work
The club places great emphasis on its role as a social focus for the entire local community, and part of this role is to offer the chance to play football to all. For this reason AFC Wimbledon established the Community Football Scheme (CFS) in 2004. On 1 May 2010, AFC Wimbledon's Community Football Scheme was awarded the FA Charter Standard Community Club Award, the highest graded award attainable in the FA Charter Standard Club Programme, in recognition of the club's outstanding coaching facilities in the local community. The club offer a number of different football courses open to children of any ability aged 4–14, who receive coaching from FA qualified coaches. The club aim to reach as many children as possible through their football and multi-sports programme by having vital links with their surrounding boroughs, most notably Merton and Kingston, which has allowed them to become one of the main providers of sports coaching in their local community.

AFC Wimbledon also offers a Schools Coaching Programme in Merton, Kingston and neighbouring boroughs. The club look to encourage a healthy and active lifestyle for both Primary and Secondary school children through football and a range of other sports. The sessions are run with an emphasis on learning, development and health awareness in a fun coaching environment. On 15 March 2012, coaches from the CFS, in partnership with the Football League's main sponsor nPower, engaged in a community outreach scheme promoting the FA's 'Respect' campaign to school pupils. Nearly 2,000 children aged 10 and 11 were taught how abusive verbal and physical behaviour on the pitch to both players and referees should never be tolerated under any circumstances. The aim of the nationwide 'Respect' scheme in schools is to eradicate racism, homophobia, violence and dissent from the next generation of footballers and supporters.

On 27 March 2012, AFC Wimbledon became the first football club to be presented with the Prime Minister's Big Society Award for outstanding contributions to the local community. The club was recognised for the honour because it offers a wide range of community development schemes including 19 youth and women's teams, school health and sport projects (hundreds of children a week participate in the outreach schemes provided) and a range of innovative activities, including a stadium school to help children get to grips with maths by using football as a teaching aid.

Congratulating AFC Wimbledon on receiving the award, then Prime Minister David Cameron said:

Accepting the award, Erik Samuelson, chief executive of AFC Wimbledon stated:

A group formed by the club's fans, the Dons Local Action Group, stepped up during the COVID-19 pandemic in 2020, ensuring community members were distributed sufficient food and that students locked down at home had the technology they needed to keep up with classes.

Players

Current squad

Out on loan

For youth teams see AFC Wimbledon Development Squad and Academy.

Player of the year, club captains and top scorers
The following table shows players who have previously been selected to be club captain, have been The Wimbledon Independent Supporters Association (WISA) player of the year and have been the player who scored the most league goals in a season (including penalties) in chronological order:

Most league appearances and goals

For a list of all AFC Wimbledon players who hold appearance or goal-scoring records see List of AFC Wimbledon records and statistics.

Notable former players

Wimbledon Old Players Association
As part of WISA's campaign to try and reclaim the history of Wimbledon Football Club, the Wimbledon Old Players Association (WOPA) was formed in 2005. Membership of WOPA is open to all former Wimbledon F.C. and AFC Wimbledon players and managers. Among the sixty founding members were Glenn Mulcaire, who scored AFC Wimbledon's first ever goal in 2002 and Kevin Cooper, who remains the club's all-time highest goal scorer with 107 goals between August 2002 and May 2004, as well as retaining the title for the most goals scored in a season with 66 during 2003–04. Others that joined included some of the legends of the old Wimbledon F.C. such as John Fashanu, Dave Beasant, Efan Ekoku, Neil Sullivan, Dave Bassett, Wally Downes, Marcus Gayle, Neal Ardley, Alan Kimble, Andy Thorn, Roger Joseph, Dickie Guy, Allen Batsford, Roger Connell, Ian Cooke, Roy Law and Steve Galliers. On 16 July 2006, WOPA fielded a team in the Masters Football Tournament at Wembley Arena, with AFC Wimbledon's backing. The team included Carlton Fairweather, Scott Fitzgerald, Marcus Gayle, and Dean Holdsworth.

In June 2010, Vinnie Jones, another former player of Wimbledon F.C., donated his 1988 FA Cup winners medal to the fans of AFC Wimbledon. The medal is on display at Wimbledon in Sporting History's Museum at Plough Lane.

Management

Current management and coaching staff

Current academy and youth development staff

Managerial history

These statistics incorporate results for league matches (including Play-off matches) and results in all major League Cup competitions (including the Combined Counties League Premier Challenge Cup, the Isthmian League Cup, the Conference League Cup, the Football League Cup and the Football League Trophy) as well as results in the FA Vase, the FA Trophy and the FA Cup.

* Terry Eames was suspended as manager on 13th February for disciplinary reasons, but was not officially dismissed until 18th February 2004. Following his suspension, the role was undertaken by his assistant Nicky English.

** Wally Downes was suspended as manager on 25th September 2019 after he was charged by the Football Association over bets placed on games, with his assistant Glyn Hodges taking over his duties. Downes was not officially dismissed until 20th October 2019, when he was suspended by the FA after admitting breaching Football Association rules around betting. Hodges was then named his permanent replacement.

Women

AFC Wimbledon Women switched affiliation from Wimbledon F.C. after the 2002–03 season.

Kevin Foster is the manager and the team competes in the PL South East Division One.

Wimbledon Women's former player Sophie Hosking won an Olympic gold medal for Team GB in the women's lightweight double sculls at the London 2012 games. Hosking continues to be an avid supporter of AFC Wimbledon and demonstrated as such when she painted her fingernails in the club's royal blue and yellow colours for the Olympic final at Dorney Lake on 4 August 2012.

Club honours

Statistics are correct as of 2 May 2009.

League honours

 Football League
 League Two
 Play-off winners (1): 2015–16
 Football Conference
 Conference Premier
 Play-off winners (1): 2010–11
 Conference South
 Champions (1): 2008–09
 Isthmian League
 Premier Division
 Play-off winners (1): 2007–08
 Division One
 Champions (1): 2004–05
Combined Counties League
 Premier Division
 Champions (1): 2003–04

Cups and Trophies

Combined Counties League Premier Challenge Cup
 Winners (1): 2003–04

Minor honours

Isle of Man Tournament
 Winners (1): 2009–10
Lanes Cup
 Winners (2): 2007–08 2011–12
London Senior Cup
 Winners (1): 2013–14
 Runners-up (1): 2009–10
Surrey Senior Cup
 Winners (1): 2004–05
 Runners-up (1): 2005–06

Awards
Big Society Award
 Winners: 2011–12
BBC London Sports Awards Team of the Year
 Winners (1): 2011–12
BBC London Sports Awards Non-professional Team of the Year
 Winners (1): 2003–04 2008–09
FA Charter Standard Community Club Award
 Winners (1): 2009–10
Football League Family Excellence Award
 Winners (2): 2011–12 2012–13
Football League Award for Community Promotion of the Girls/Kids Cup
 Winners (2): 2011–12 2012–13
Football Conference Fair Play Award for Good Sportsmanship
 Winners (2): 2008–09 2009–10
Isthmian League Fair Play Award for Good Sportsmanship
 Winners (1): 2007–08
Conference South Programme of the Year
 Winners (1): 2008–09
Isthmian League Programme of the Year
 Winners (1): 2007–08

References

External links

 
 The Dons Trust
 

 
2002 establishments in England
Association football clubs established in 2002
Combined Counties Football League
Fan-owned football clubs in England
Football clubs in England
Football clubs in London
Isthmian League
Wimbledon
Sport in the Royal Borough of Kingston upon Thames
Sport in the London Borough of Merton
English Football League clubs
AFC Wimbledon
Phoenix clubs (association football)